Plum Creek Township is a township in Kossuth County, Iowa, United States.

It took its name from Plum Creek.

References

Townships in Kossuth County, Iowa
Townships in Iowa